Wilfrid Albert "Wil" Schroder (1946 – October 26, 2013) was a justice of the Kentucky Supreme Court from 2007 to 2013.

Early life, education, and career
Born in Fort Mitchell, Kentucky, Schroder received a B.A. from the University of Kentucky in 1968, followed by a J.D. degree from the same institution in 1970. He received an LL.M. from the University of Missouri–Kansas City in 1971. He worked for a time at the Kansas City Legal Aid Society, and in-house for the St. Paul Insurance Company, and taught law as an assistant professor at Northern Kentucky University's Salmon P. Chase College of Law. He entered private practice in 1975.

Judicial career
Schroder was a judge of the Kenton County District Court from 1983 to 1991. In June 1991, Governor Wallace Wilkinson appointed him to a seat on the Sixth Appellate District of the Kentucky Court of Appeals vacated by the death of Judge Judy West. Schroder ran unopposed for election to the full term. He served in that capacity until 2006, when he was elected to the state supreme court, serving until his retirement in January 2013, due to health issues caused by a brain tumor.

Personal life and death
Schroder married Nancy E. Quirk, with whom he had two daughters and a son. Nancy, a schoolteacher, died of breast cancer in 1991, at the age of 46. In 1993, he married Susan Wahlbrink, they had no children. Schroder died in Fort Mitchell at the age of 67. His son, Wil Schroder, became a member of the Kentucky Senate.

References

1946 births
2013 deaths
People from Kenton County, Kentucky
University of Kentucky alumni
University of Missouri School of Law alumni
Salmon P. Chase College of Law faculty
Justices of the Kentucky Supreme Court
Deaths from brain tumor